Dhuusar is a 2020 Indian drama film directed by Soumi Saha and Snehashish Mondal, which features Ritwik Bhowmik in the lead role. It premiered at the 20th Lucania Film Festival, Italy, where it won the Best Screenplay and Best Actor award for Saha who is the writer, co-director, co-producer, production designer, costume designer, actor and editor of the film. It had its Indian premiere in Mumbai, at the 10th Jagran Film Festival before travelling to several international film festivals including Winchester Film Festival, United Kingdom, Barcelona International Film Festival, Spain, South Europe International Film Festival, Spain, and the Queen Palm International Film Festival, United States, where it won the Gold award for Best Feature & Best Editor (Soumi Saha), Silver award for Best Actor (Ritwik Bhowmik), Bronze award for Best Producer, and an Honorable Mention for Best Costume Design.

Dhuusar is inspired by a real life incident of Sajal Barui, who was a convicted criminal of Kolkata, India for the murder of his family at the age of 16. The film is also a semi-autobiographical account of Saha's childhood and adolescence, depicting her relationship with a former lover and her mother.

Cast 
 Arya Mallick – Kid Shila
 Vinay Pathak – Supt. Avinash Gautam
 Subrat Dutta – Prashanta Guha
 Ritwik Bhowmik – Shiladitya Guha
 Senjuti Mukherjee  – Paromita Guha

 Arpita Banerjee – Shuto
 Soumi Saha – Purva Sharma
 Doab Mukherjee – Teen Shila
 Yashraj Jadhav - Kaka

References

External links 
 

Indian drama films
2019 films
2019 drama films